Quinault Rex is a  tall Douglas fir discovered near the south shore of Lake Quinault in 1999. As of 2000, it was the tallest Douglas fir known to be standing.

References

Sources
 
 
 

Individual Douglas firs
Individual trees in Washington (state)